A cavalry-mechanized group was a type of military formation used in the Red Army during World War II against Germany and Japan. It involved a combination of armor and horses.

Organization 
A cavalry-mechanized group normally consisted of a cavalry corps (a unit smaller than a standard infantry division despite its name) and a mechanized corps, and was slightly stronger than a German Panzergrenadier division. The main force element providing combat power was the armoured and motorized formations of the mechanized corps, while the horse-mounted elements of the cavalry corps provided increased flexibility in infiltration and fighting in difficult terrain such as large forests, or swamps, and the ability to continue mobile operations when cut off from supply lines.

Cavalry-mechanized groups were often named after their commander, for example Cavalry-Mechanized Group Pliyev named after Pliyev.

As an example, during the 1945 Soviet invasion of Manchuria, the Soviet-Mongolian Cavalry-Mechanized Group under the command of Colonel General I.A.Pliyev consisted of the following units:

85th Rifle Corps Headquarters
59th Cavalry Division
25th Mechanized Brigade
27th Motorized Rifle Brigade
43d Tank Brigade
30th Motorcycle Regiment
Aviation-Mixed Division (Mongolian)
5th Mongolian Cavalry Division
6th Mongolian Cavalry Division
7th Mongolian Cavalry Division
8th Mongolian Cavalry Division
7th Motorized Armored Brigade (Mongolian)
3d Separate Tank Regiment (Mongolian)
35th Tank Destroyer Artillery Brigade
1914th Antiaircraft Artillery Regiment
1917th Antiaircraft Artillery Regiment
60th Guards Mortar Regiment (Rocket Launchers)
3d Artillery Regiment (Mongolian)

The formation operated in two march columns during the first stage of the battle, advancing rapidly against light opposition, preceded by forward detachments:

Column 1:
25th Mechanized Brigade
43d Tank Bde
267th Tank Regt

Column 2:
27th Mechanized Rifle Brigade
7th Armored Car Bde
30th Motorcycle Regt

Tactics 
Cavalry-mechanized groups were used during the second half of the Soviet-German War, following the successful breaching of a German defense.  They would then be inserted to penetrate deep into the rear of the German lines and interrupt supply and reinforcement movements there.  This was a risky task, shown for example by the destruction of Cavalry-Mechanized Group Pliyev during the Battle of Debrecen in Hungary, in autumn 1944.

Cavalry units in the Red Army usually fought as dismounted infantry.  Only when they faced a completely disorganised enemy, for example during the battle of the Korsun Pocket in 1944, or when they were themselves in a desperate situation, such as during Operation Mars in 1942, would they undertake a traditional cavalry charge.

After the Second World War 
Cavalry was widely seen as anachronistic by the start of World War II.  The Red Army was the only army to make use of cavalry formations in full-scale combat during the war, and despite the successful use of cavalry formations by the Red Army during the war, the last cavalry division, 4th Guards Cavalry Division, was disbanded in 1955.

Notes

References 
 
US Army TM30-430 'Handbook on Red Army armed forces'
Zaloga, S. and Ness 'The Red Army Handbook'

External links 
Article on the use of cavalry by the Red Army

Red Army units and formations of World War II
Cavalry units and formations of the Soviet Union
Mechanized units and formations